Sir Richard Ranulph FitzHerbert, 9th Baronet (born 2 November 1963), is a British landowner and holds the FitzHerbert baronetcy, which he inherited in 1989 along with the family home, Tissington Hall, on the death of his uncle, Sir John FitzHerbert. At the time of his inheritance, he was working as a wine merchant.

He is the son of Major the Rev. David Henry FitzHerbert MC by his marriage to Charmian Hyacinthe Allsopp. Educated at Eton, he is an elected Conservative district councillor for the Parwich and Dovedale ward on Derbyshire Dales District Council. and is Chief Executive of Tissington Hall and estate.

FitzHerbert married Caroline Louise Shuter in 1993. They had two children, but later divorced. He married secondly Fiona, now Lady FitzHerbert, at Tissington Hall in October 2011, becoming stepfather to her two children.

Sir Richard appeared on the Weakest Link (Series 10, Episode 66), broadcast on 6 November 2008. He was voted off in Round 2, receiving 6 votes. Just 6 days earlier, He appeared as a contestant on ITV gameshow Golden Balls (series 4), broadcast on 31 October 2008.

References

External links 

 

Living people
1963 births
People from Derbyshire Dales (district)
Conservative Party (UK) councillors
Councillors in Derbyshire
Baronets in the Baronetage of Great Britain
People educated at Eton College
21st-century British politicians